Christian Gamarino (born 18 June 1994 in Genoa) is an Italian motorcycle racer. He currently competes in the CIV Superbike Championship aboard a BMW S1000RR. He has previously competed in the Supersport World Championship and the European Superstock 600 Championship. In 2022 FIM Endurance World Championship he rides for Team 33 Louit April Moto in superstock category.

Career

European Superstock 600 Championship

Gamarino made his European Superstock 600 Championship debut in 2011. He had a difficult rookie season and scored points in four races. His best finish of the season was a ninth-place finish at Misano. Gamarino finished 25th in the Championship. 2012 proved to be a breakthrough season for Gamarino as he finished eighth in the Championship with 61  points. He also scored his first podium finish at Misano. In 2013 Gamarino won his first Superstock 600 race at Silverstone. He contended for the Championship but eventually finished third to Franco Morbidelli and Alessandro Nocco.

Supersport World Championship

In 2014 Gamarino stepped up to the Supersport World Championship riding a Kawasaki ZX-6R for Team Go Eleven. He finished 15th in the championship scoring 27 points. Gamarino had a very consistent 2015 season and finished 10th in the Championship. Gamarino had a challenging 2016 season and dropped to 19th in the standings. He did however scored a career best finish of fourth at the season opener in Phillip Island.

Career statistics

Supersport World Championship

Races by year
(key) (Races in bold indicate pole position) (Races in italics indicate fastest lap)

 * Season still in progress.

References

External links
Profile on WorldSBK.com

Living people
1994 births
Italian motorcycle racers
Supersport World Championship riders